The mobile quarantine facility (MQF) was a converted Airstream trailer used by NASA to quarantine  astronauts returning from Apollo lunar missions for the first few days after splashdown. The MQF was on the aircraft carrier that picked up the capsule. Once the aircraft carrier reached port, the MQF was flown to Houston, and the crew served the remainder of the 21 days of quarantine in the Lunar Receiving Laboratory at the Manned Spacecraft Center.  The purpose of the quarantine was to prevent the spread of any contagions from the Moon, though the existence of such contagions was considered unlikely.  It functioned by maintaining a lower pressure inside and filtering any air vented.

History
In June of 1967, NASA awarded contract to design and build the four MQF's to Melpar, Inc., of Falls Church, Virginia. Lawrence K. Eliason was the head project manager.

The MQF contained living and sleeping facilities as well as communications equipment which the astronauts used to converse with their families. The Apollo 11 crew also used this equipment to speak with President Nixon, who personally welcomed them back to Earth in July 1969 aboard the recovery ship USS Hornet after splashdown.

The trailers housed the three crew as well as a physician, William Carpentier, and an engineer, John Hirasaki, who ran the MQF and powered down the command module.

Four MQFs were built for NASA:

The quarantine requirement was eliminated following Apollo 14 once it was proven the Moon was sterile and that the facilities were therefore unnecessary.

See also
 Crew transport vehicle

References

External links
 Film footage of President Richard Nixon speaking with the Apollo 11 astronauts in their mobile quarantine facility on the USS Hornet
 NASA.gov

Apollo program hardware
Quarantine facilities in the United States